Elections were held in Western Visayas for seats in the House of Representatives of the Philippines on May 13, 2013.

The candidate with the most votes will win that district's seat for the 16th Congress of the Philippines.

Summary

Aklan
Incumbent Florencio Miraflores is term limited and running for the governorship. His cousin, Kasangga party-list representative Teodorico Haresco is his party's nominee but he is running as an independent.

Antique
Paolo Everardo Javier is the incumbent.

Bacolod
Anthony Golez Jr. is the incumbent. Originally from the Nationalist People's Coalition (NPC), his party nominated incumbent Mayor Evelio Leonardia instead. As a result, Golez is running as an independent.

Capiz

1st District
Antonio Del Rosario is the incumbent.

2nd District
Jane Castro is the incumbent.

Guimaras
Joaquin Carlos Nava is the incumbent.

Iloilo

1st District
Incumbent Janette Garin is term limited and is ineligible to run. Her husband, Vice Governor Oscar Garin Jr. is running in her place.

2nd District
Augusto Syjuco Jr. is the incumbent, he was defeated by pavia mayor Arcadio Gorriceta and rank 3 on election results.

3rd District
Arthur Defensor Jr. is the incumbent

4th District
Incumbent Ferjenel Biron is term limited and is ineligible to run. His brother, Hernan Biron Jr. is running in his place. His opponent is former governor Niel Tupas Sr. If Tupas elected, he will join his son Niel Jr. in the house separately.

5th District
Niel Tupas Jr. is the incumbent

Iloilo City

Jerry Treñas is the incumbent. He will be facing off against former congressman Raul Gonzales Jr.

Negros Occidental

1st District
Jules Ledesma is Incumbent.

2nd District
Alfredo Marañon III is term limited; he is running for the mayorship of Sagay; the National Unity Party named Leo Rafael Cueva as their nominee, he will be facing off against former Schools Division Superintendent of Cadiz City Otilia Galilea of the NPC.

3rd District
Alfredo Benitez is the incumbent. He will face former Representative Jose Carlos Lacson.

4th District
Incumbent Jeffrey Ferrer's certificate of nomination was unilaterally withdrawn by the Nationalist People's Coalition (NPC) after he campaigned for Alfredo Marañon Jr. of the United Negros Alliance in the gubernatorial election instead of NPC nominee Vice Governor Genaro Alvarez Jr. The NPC instead is supporting independent Ike Barredo's candidacy.

5th District
Alejandro Mirasol is the incumbent; he won in a special election that was called after erstwhile incumbent Iggy Arroyo died.

6th District
Mercedes Alvarez is the incumbent.

References
Philippines 2013 Election Results - Main Site

2013 Philippine general election
Lower house elections in Western Visayas